Bhumika (English: Role) is a 1977 Indian film directed by Shyam Benegal. The film stars Smita Patil, Amol Palekar, Anant Nag, Naseeruddin Shah and Amrish Puri.

The film is broadly based on the Marathi-language memoirs, Sangtye Aika of the well-known Marathi stage and screen actress of the 1940s Hansa Wadkar, who led a flamboyant and unconventional life, and focuses on an individual's search for identity and self-fulfilment. Smita Patil gives a strong performance of transforming from a vivacious teenager to a wiser but deeply wounded middle-aged woman.

The film won two National Film Awards and Filmfare Best Movie Award.  It was invited to Carthage Film Festival 1978, Chicago Film Festival, where it was awarded the Golden Plaque 1978, and in 1986 it was invited to Festival of Images, Algeria.

Plot
Bhumika tells the life story of an actress, Usha (Smita Patil), who is the granddaughter of a famous female singer of the old tradition from the Devadasi community of Goa. Usha's mother (Sulabha Deshpande) is married to an abusive and alcoholic man. Following his early death, and over her mother's objections, Usha is taken to Bombay by family hanger-on Keshav Dalvi (Amol Palekar) to audition successfully as a singer in a Bombay studio: the first step in a process, watched approvingly by Usha's doting grandmother and with horror by her mother, that will eventually carry her to on-camera adolescent stardom, and to an ill-starred love marriage with Keshav. Usha's motives for stubbornly pursuing this relationship (culminating in a pre-marital pregnancy) with the unattractive and much older Keshav — who appears to have lusted after her since childhood — are not spelled out. Presumably, she either feels indebted to him for his loyalty to her family (of which he frequently reminds her) and for her own worldly success; or simply views him as a means to escape her abusive home. She is also a headstrong girl who clearly enjoys her acting career and is bent on challenging her uptight mother (who opposes the match because Keshav does not belong to their caste, just as she opposes cinema itself because of its presumed disreputability).

Once the two are wed, Usha is shocked to find Keshav continuing to act as her "business manager", arranging starring roles for her opposite heartthrob Rajan (Anant Nag), who is himself in (unrequited) love with her. Since Keshav's own business is unsuccessful, the family remains entirely dependent on Usha's earnings – a fact that Keshav clearly resents. He thus becomes both a jealous husband with a fragile ego and nasty temper, as well as (in effect) a greedy pimp who compels his wife to take risqué work despite her dislike of her co-star and her protests that she "only wants to be a housewife" now that their daughter has been born. Not surprisingly, the relationship becomes increasingly poisoned, particularly by Keshav's suspicion (fed by star-magazine gossip) that she is having an affair with Rajan, which is partly true. Verbally and physically abused by her husband and periodically obliged to live in a hotel, separated from her daughter and mother, the desperately unhappy actress eventually instigates two unsatisfying liaisons: with the nihilistic and self-centered director Sunil Verma (Naseeruddin Shah), with whom she plots a double-suicide (which he foils), and then with the wealthy businessman Vinayak Kale (Amrish Puri), who keeps her as a pampered mistress on his palatial estate. Here Usha briefly finds a kind of "respectability" as a de facto second wife, earning a measure of love and admiration from Kale's mother (Dina Pathak), son, and bedridden first wife — but (as she learns one day when she tries to take the boy to a nearby fair) at the cost of even the most rudimentary freedom. Unable to abide by Kale's feudal patriarchal rules, she finds her only hope of escape in the intervention of her still-legitimate husband, the hated Keshav, who promptly brings her back to a Bombay festooned with billboards of her own face, and to the same drab hotel and lonely prospects. As Kale's bitter wife remarks to Usha as the latter prepares to leave, "The beds change, the kitchens change. Men's masks change, but men don't change." Usha's daughter, now grown-up, invites Usha to live with her and her husband, but Usha refuses. The movie ends with Usha, alone in her hotel room, receiving a phone call from Rajan.

Cast
 Smita Patil as Urvashi alias Usha
 Amol Palekar as Keshav Dalvi
 Anant Nag as Rajan
 Amrish Puri as Vinayak Kale
 Naseeruddin Shah as Sunil Verma
 Dina Pathak as Mrs. Kale, Vinayak's mother
 Kulbhushan Kharbanda as Film Producer Harilal
 Sulabha Deshpande as Shanta
 Kiran Vairale as Sushma Dalvi
 Mohan Agashe as Siddharth Sutar
 Benjamin Gilani as actor Mohan playing Mughal prince in song 'Saawan ke din aaye'
 Abishek
 Baby Rukhsana as Young Usha
 B. V. Karanth as Usha's father
 Kusum Deshpande as Shanta's mother
 Rekha Sabnis as Mrs.Yashwant Kale
 Baby Bitto as young Sushma
 G. M. Durrani as music teacher
 Sudarshan Dheer as dance director (he is also the choreographer of this movie)
 Master Abhitab as Dinu
 Sunila Pradhan as actress Ms.Bala the 'Princess'
 Om Puri as stage actor as 'Evil king'
 Savita Bajaj as Basanti

Production
The film was based on autobiography of the doyenne of Marathi theatre and cinema Hansa Wadkar during the 1940s and 50s.  The biography was told to journalist Arun Sadhu, who used the title of the hit musical, Sangtye Aika (1959) or " "Listen, and I'll Tell."

The film was set in Maharashtra region. Benegal's previous films were based in Andhra region, and since he was unfamiliar with the region, he roped in screenwriter and playwright Girish Karnad to co-write the script. Another noted theatre director and playwright Satyadev Dubey wrote the dialogues. The story moves back and forth across flashbacks to the early life of Wadkar. Apart from the non-linear narrative, the film also employed the film within a film device.

Lead actress, a 22-year-old Smita Patil still new to the medium, found the role daunting initially, yet as the filming progress, playing the multi-layered character, she found not only her space the industry and went to win the Best Actress Award for her performance, and today it is considered one of the best performances of her career.

Crew
Director : Shyam Benegal
Producer : Lalit M. Bijlani, Bhisham M. Bijlani, Freni Variava, Silloo F. Variava
Writer : Hansa Wadkar (based on Marathi novel "Sangtye Aika")
Screenplay : Shyam Benegal, Girish Karnad, Satyadev Dubey
Dialogues : Satyadev Dubey
Cinematographer : Govind Nihalani
Editor : Bhanudas Divakar, Ramnik Patel
Costume Designer : Kalpana Lajmi
Choreographer : Sudarshan Dheer

Music

The song 'Baju re Mondar' is sung by two stalwart vocalists of Hindustani classical music, Saraswati Rane daughter of Ustad Abdul Karim Khan of Kirana gharana and Meena Fatherpekar her grand daughter.

Awards and nominations

|-
| rowspan="2"|1977
| Smita Patil
| National Film Award for Best Actress
| 
|-
| Satyadev Dubey, Shyam Benegal, Girish Karnad
| National Film Award for Best Screenplay
| 
|-
| rowspan="2"|1978
| Lalit M. Bijlani, Freni Variava
| Filmfare Award for Best Film
| 
|-
| Smita Patil
| Filmfare Award for Best Actress
| 
|}

Trivia

In scene after the marriage of Usha and Keshav, the song 'Ek bangla bane nyara' from movie President (1937 film) sung by K.L. Saigal plays in the background.

References

External links

 

1977 films
1970s Hindi-language films
Films directed by Shyam Benegal
Films featuring a Best Actress National Award-winning performance
Indian biographical films
Biographical films about actors
Films based on biographies
Indian nonlinear narrative films
Films about women in India
Films whose writer won the Best Original Screenplay National Film Award
1970s biographical films